KAJA (97.3 MHz "KJ97") is a commercial FM radio station licensed to San Antonio, Texas.  It airs a country music radio format and is owned by locally based iHeartMedia, Inc.   The studios and offices are located in the Stone Oak neighborhood in Far North San Antonio.

KAJA has an effective radiated power (ERP) of 100,000 watts, the maximum for non-grandfathered FM stations.  The transmitter site is off Galm Road in the Far West Side of San Antonio, near Government Canyon State Natural Area.

History
In 1951, the station signed on as KITE-FM.  It simulcast co-owned AM 930 KITE (now KLUP).  Because KITE was a daytimer at the time, KITE-FM was able to continue its programming into the night.  KITE-AM-FM were owned by Charles W. Balthrope.  KITE-FM transmitted with 6,200 watts, a fraction of its current output.

A few years later, the station flipped to a beautiful music format.  The call sign switched to KEEZ in 1958, to reflect easy listening music. In 1960, KEEZ and KITE were bought by the Townsend U.S. International Growth Fund.  The power increased to 17,500 watts, covering San Antonio and its suburbs in that era.

KEEZ was sold to San Antonio Broadcasting Company in 1975. SABC was owned by Lowry Mays, Red McCombs, and Paul Schaffer (no relation to Paul Schaffer of The Late Show fame). A year later the same owners bought AM 1200 WOAI, and owing to WOAI operating as a 50,000-watt clear-channel station, named their company Clear Channel Communications. In the late seventies SABC and Clear Channel were merged into a new Clear Channel, which went on to own more than 1,000 radio stations.

KEEZ became WOAI-FM from 1978-1981.  The station adopted the KAJA call letters and current country format in 1981.  In 1987, KAJA got a rival FM station, when 100.3 KCYY began its own country music format.  KAJA and KCYY, owned by Cox Media, have competed for San Antonio country listeners for more than three decades.

On October 18, 2010, KAJA won the 2010 Country Music Association (CMA) Large Market Radio Station of the Year award. This was the station's first CMA award win. The staff accepted the award at the show in November. In October 2012, Randy Carroll and Jamie Martin won the 2012 CMA Large Market Personality of the Year award. It was their first CMA win. They accepted their awards at the show on November 1.

References

External links
KJ-97's website

Country radio stations in the United States
AJA
Radio stations established in 1951
IHeartMedia radio stations
1951 establishments in Texas